The modern constellation Phoenix lies across one of the quadrants symbolized by the White Tiger of the West (西方白虎, Xī Fāng Bái Hǔ), and The Southern Asterisms (近南極星區, Jìnnánjíxīngōu), that divide the sky in traditional Chinese uranography.

According to the quadrant, constellation Phoenix in Chinese sky is not fully seen. Ankaa (Alpha Phoenicis) are bright stars in this constellation that possibly never seen in Chinese sky.

The name of the western constellation in modern Chinese is 鳳凰座 (fèng huáng zuò), which means "the phoenix constellation".

Stars
The map of Chinese constellation in constellation Phoenix area consists of :

See also
Traditional Chinese star names
Chinese constellations
List of brightest stars

References

External links
Phoenix – Chinese associations

Astronomy in China
Phoenix (constellation)